Karagulovo (Qarağol) is a rural locality (a village) in Meshchegarovsky Selsoviet, Salavatsky District, Bashkortostan, Russia. The population was 231 as of 2010. There are 4 streets.

Geography 
Karagulovo is located 52 km southeast of Maloyaz (the district's administrative centre) by road. Mursalimkino is the nearest rural locality.

References 

Rural localities in Salavatsky District